Paul Todd Makler Sr. (October 22, 1920 – May 12, 2022) was an American Olympic foil and épée fencer.

Early and personal life
Makler was born in Philadelphia, Pennsylvania, and was Jewish. He attended the University of Pennsylvania, fencing for the University of Pennsylvania Quakers, and University of Pennsylvania Medical School, graduating in 1964, became a physician, and practiced internal medicine for many years. His sons Paul Makler Jr. and Brooke Makler fenced at the 1972 Summer Olympics and the 1976 Summer Olympics, respectively.

Makler died in Los Altos, California on May 12, 2022, at the age of 101.

Fencing career
Makler competed in the individual and team épée events at the 1952 Summer Olympics in Helsinki. He won a silver medal in the team foil event at the 1955 Pan American Games. Makler competed for Salle Csiszar, winning an Amateur Fencers League of America (AFLA) national team épée title with the club in 1956. Makler was President of the American Fencing Association in 1962.

References

External links
 

1920 births
2022 deaths
21st-century American Jews
American male foil fencers
American male épée fencers
Olympic fencers of the United States
Fencers at the 1952 Summer Olympics
Fencers from Philadelphia
Pan American Games medalists in fencing
Pan American Games silver medalists for the United States
Jewish male épée fencers
Jewish male foil fencers
Jewish American sportspeople
Fencers at the 1955 Pan American Games
University of Pennsylvania alumni
Perelman School of Medicine at the University of Pennsylvania alumni
American internists
Penn Quakers fencers
American centenarians
Men centenarians
Medalists at the 1955 Pan American Games